Ashayer Rural District is a rural district (dehestan) in the Central District of Fereydunshahr County, Isfahan Province, Iran. At the 2006 census, its population was 2,562, in 524 families.  The rural district has 7 villages.

References 

Rural Districts of Isfahan Province
Fereydunshahr County